Genesee County is a county in the U.S. state of New York. As of the 2020 census, the population was 58,388. Its county seat is Batavia. Its name is from Seneca word Gen-nis'-hee-yo, meaning "the Beautiful Valley". The county was created in 1802 and organized in 1803.

Genesee County comprises the Batavia, NY micropolitan statistical area, which is also in the Rochester-Batavia-Seneca Falls, NY combined statistical area. It is in Western New York. It is the namesake of Genesee County, Michigan; that is, the Michigan county was named for Genesee County,  New York.

History

Pre-Columbian era
The archaeological record at the Hiscock Site, in Byron, New York goes back 10,000 to 12,000 years to the Ice Age. Researchers have found a variety of manmade tools, ceramics, metal, and leather, along with a mastodon jaw, tusks, and teeth, and assorted animal bones, indicating long occupation of the site. This site is among North America's most important for archaeological artifacts from the Ice Age.

Varying cultures of indigenous peoples lived in the area for thousands of years. Hundreds of years before European exploration, the Iroquoian-speaking Seneca Nation developed in the central part of present-day New York; it became one of the first Five Nations of the Haudenosaunee (Iroquois Confederacy). Beginning in 1639 and lasting for the rest of the century, the Seneca led an invasion of Western New York, driving out the existing tribes of Wenro, Erie and Neutrals.

Colonial and revolutionary era
When counties were established in New York State in 1683, the present Genesee County was part of Albany County. This was an enormous county, including the northern part of New York State as well as all of the present State of Vermont and, in theory, extending westward to the Pacific Ocean. On March 12, 1772, what was left of Albany County was split into three parts, one remaining under the name Albany County. One of the other pieces, Tryon County, contained the western portion (and thus, since no western boundary was specified, theoretically still extended west to the Pacific). In 1784 Tryon County was renamed as Montgomery County. Around this time, the Pennsylvania Colony and the Massachusetts Bay Colony also claimed the territory as their own, but New York did not enforce its territorial claim. In 1789 Ontario County was split off from Montgomery as a result of the Phelps and Gorham Purchase. Again, the county theoretically extended west to the Pacific Ocean.

New York State
It was not until the Holland Purchase of 1793 that Western New York was enforced as the territory of New York State. Land in the region was sold through the Holland Land Company's office in Batavia, starting in 1801. All the land in Western New York was in the newly created Genesee County, and all of that was in the single town of Batavia.

The county was not fully organized so it remained under the supervision of Ontario County until it achieved full organization and separation during March 1803.

On April 7, 1806, Genesee's area was reduced to  due to a partition that created Allegany County. On March 8, 1808, Genesee's area was again reduced, this time to  due to a partition that created Cattaraugus, Chautauqua, and Niagara Counties. On February 23, 1821, Genesee's area was again reduced, this time to  due a complex partition that produced Livingston  and Monroe Counties. On March 19, 1841, Genesee's area was again reduced, this time to the  it remains to this day due to the partitioning to create Wyoming County.

19th century politics: Origins of antimasonry
Genesee County was included in the 19th century "burned-over district" — the Western region of New York consumed by religious revivals and characterized by "the evangelical desire to convert the entire American population to Christianity and to create a 'moral, homogeneous commonwealth.'"  This religious moral crusade provided the social atmosphere that allowed antimasonic sentiment to gain momentum as a significant church-oriented movement and, later, a grass-roots political party that became the nation's first third party.

By the 1820s, Freemasonry was prevalent in Genesee County. From 1821 to 1827, half of all county officials were Freemasons. In September 1826, William Morgan, a resident of Batavia, New York, disappeared after having been briefly imprisoned for failure to repay a debt. Morgan had been rejected from the Masonic lodge in Batavia, and, as a result, threatened to publish a book which exposed the secret rituals of Freemasonry. His disappearance and presumed murder ignited a campaign against Freemasonry. The investigation into Morgan's disappearance confronted major obstacles from government officials and the judiciary- positions that were largely occupied by Freemasons. The Morgan affair combined with existing suspicions and distrust of the secrecy of Freemasonry initiated mass meetings throughout the county to decide how the issue of Freemasonry should be handled. The Antimasonry crusade's original goal was to oust Masons from political offices. Through the political guidance of party organizers, such as Thurlow Weed and William H. Seward, the crusade developed into a political party that enjoyed a political stronghold in Genesee County and the rest of the "burned-over district."

The Antimasonic Party found strong support within Genesee County from 1827 to 1833. The party averaged 69 percent of the vote and won every county office. After continuous domination of Masonic politicians, citizens saw Antimasonry as a solution and an opportunity to restore justice and republicanism. The Baptist and Presbyterian churches favored Antimasonry and encouraged their members to renounce ties with the fraternity. The party was originally associated with populist rhetoric, however, strong Antimasonic sentiment throughout the county correlated with positive economic developments and high population densities. Larger towns, such as Batavia, the county seat and Le Roy, harbored the strongest support for the party. The timing of the creation of the Antimasonic Party coincided with a time in New York politics that encouraged the expansion of political participation. The party leaders made the Antimasonic Party, and later the Whig Party, a great success in Genesee County and other neighboring counties.

Modern day
In 2009, the City and Town of Batavia began exploring ways to merge or consolidate governmental systems.

Geography
Genesee County is east of Buffalo and southwest of Rochester in the western portion of New York State.

Adjacent counties
 Erie County - west
 Livingston County - southeast
 Monroe County - northeast
 Niagara County - northwest
 Orleans County - north
 Wyoming County - south

Major highways

   Interstate 90 (New York State Thruway)
  Interstate 490
  U.S. Route 20
  New York State Route 5
  New York State Route 19
  New York State Route 33
  New York State Route 63
  New York State Route 77
  New York State Route 98

Genesee County watersheds 
 Black Creek
 Canaseraga Creek to Oatka Creek, excluding Beards, Conesus and Cayuga Creek
 Honeoye Creeks
 Mud Creek
 Murder Creek
 Oak Orchard Creek
 Oatka Creek
 Ransom Creek to Mouth
 Tonawanda Creek, Middle and Upper

National protected area
 Iroquois National Wildlife Refuge (part)

State protected areas
 Darien Lakes State Park
 Oak Orchard Wildlife Management Area
 Tonawanda Wildlife Management Area

County parks
 DeWitt Recreation Area is a  park that includes a  pond.
Source:

Government and politics

Genesee County is governed by a 12–member legislature headed by a chairman.

Representation at other levels of government

Genesee County is part of:
 The 8th Judicial District of the New York Supreme Court
 The 4th Department of the New York Supreme Court, Appellate Division

Presidential elections
Genesee County is solidly Republican at the Presidential level, having last voted for a Democrat in 1964 when Lyndon Johnson won every county in New York. Since then the closest a Democrat has gotten to winning the county was Bill Clinton in 1996 when he lost to Bob Dole by 3 percent. In 2020 Donald Trump received 64.6 percent of the vote which was the best result for a Republican since 1984 when Ronald Reagan received 65.8 percent. 

|}

Law enforcement
The primary law enforcement agency is the Genesee County Sheriff's Office.

In most counties in N.Y., the undersheriff is the warden of the county jail. In Genesee County, the sheriff has ultimate authority to operate the 80-bed county jail, built in 1985.  In this county, rather than an undersheriff, it is managed by a "jail superintendent" with 27 other employees and managers. The current Genesee County Jail was built in 1985.

Demographics

2020 Census

2000 census
As of the 2000 census, there were 60,370 people, 22,770 households, and 15,825 families residing in the county. The population density was 122 people per square mile (47/km2). There were 24,190 housing units, with an average density of 49 per square mile (19/km2). The county's racial makeup was 94.69% White, 2.13% Black or African American, 0.78% Native American, 0.48% Asian, 0.02% Pacific Islander, 0.71% from other races, and 1.18% from two or more races. 1.50% of the population were Hispanic or Latino of any race. 25.0% were of German, 15.2% Italian, 13.5% English, 13.1% Irish, 8.9% Polish and 5.6% American ancestry according to Census 2000. 96.5% spoke English and 1.5% Spanish as their first language.

There were 22,770 households, of which 33.30% had children under the age of 18. 55.4% were married couples living together, 9.80% had a female householder with no husband present, and 30.50% were non-families. 24.80% of households were made up of individuals, and 11.10% had someone living alone who was 65 years of age or older. The average household size was 2.59 and the average family size was 3.10.

26.10% of the county's population was under the age of 18, 7.50% were from age 18 to 24, 29.50% were from age 25 to 44, 22.60% were from age 45 to 64, and 14.30% were age 65 or older. The median age was 37 years. For every 100 females there were 96.90 males. For every 100 females age 18 and over, there were 95.00 males.

The U.S. Census in 2000 showed the county had a 63.7% employment rate and 2.9% were unemployed. The median household income was $40,542, and the median family income was $47,771. Males had a median income of $34,430 versus $23,788 for females. The county's per capita income was $18,498. About 5.60% of families and 7.60% of the population were below the poverty line, including 9.00% of those under age 18 and 6.80% of those age 65 or over.

Education
The county has eight public school districts:
 Akron Central School District
 Albion Central School District
 Alden Central School District
 Alexander Central School District
 Attica Central School District
 Batavia City School District
 Brockport Central School District
 Byron-Bergen Central School District
 Caledonia-Mumford Central School District
 Elba Central School District
 Le Roy Central School District
 Medina Central School District
 Oakfield-Alabama Central School District
 Pavilion Central School District
 Pembroke Central School District
 Royalton-Hartland Central School District
 Wyoming Central School District

It has one state-operated school: New York State School for the Blind

Several private schools at the primary and secondary levels are also maintained:
 St. Joseph Elementary School, Batavia
 Notre Dame High School, Batavia
 St. Paul Lutheran School, Batavia
 Holy Family School, LeRoy (closed at the end of the 2011–2012 academic year.)

Genesee Community College has its main campus in the Town of Batavia.

Communities

Larger Settlements

† - County Seat

‡ - Not Wholly in this County

Towns

 Alabama
 Alexander
 Batavia
 Bergen
 Bethany
 Byron
 Darien
 Elba
 Le Roy
 Oakfield
 Pavilion
 Pembroke
 Stafford

Other hamlets
 East Bethany
 Indian Falls
 North Bergen

Indian reservations
 Tonawanda Reservation

See also

 Holland Purchase
 List of counties in New York
 National Register of Historic Places listings in Genesee County, New York

References

Further reading

External links
 
 Genesee County Chamber of Commerce website, includes tourist and area information
  Local history source
 504 Biographies from Genesee County
 Genesee County Histories
 Museum Dedicated to the History of Genesee County, NY
 Community Page, Genesee County, NY

 
1803 establishments in New York (state)
Populated places established in 1803
New York placenames of Native American origin